The men's 50 metre freestyle event at the 2012 Summer Olympics took place on 2–3 August at the London Aquatics Centre in London, United Kingdom.

France's Florent Manaudou stunned the entire field to join his sister Laure Manaudou on top of the podium for the Olympic sprint freestyle title. Swimming in lane seven, the dark horse threw down a scorching time and a textile best of 21.34 to hold off U.S. swimmer Cullen Jones and the event's Brazilian world record holder and defending Olympic champion César Cielo by two-tenths of a second, a sizable chunk in the Olympic swimming's shortest race. Jones took home the silver in 21.54 to match his semifinal time in the process, while Cielo missed his chance to defend the title with a bronze medal in 21.59.

Cielo's teammate Bruno Fratus finished outside the podium by almost a fingertip with a fourth-place time in 21.61. After twelve years of absence as a 31-year-old, U.S. swimmer Anthony Ervin, who previously tied with Gary Hall, Jr. for the gold in 2000, managed to pull off a fifth-place finish in 21.78. Ervin was followed in sixth and seventh by four-time Olympians Roland Mark Schoeman of South Africa (21.80) and George Bovell of Trinidad and Tobago (21.82). Plagued by injury, Australia's Eamon Sullivan struggled to mount a sprint challenge in a high-calibre race as he finished eighth in 21.98.

Earlier in the semifinals, Australia's top sprinter James Magnussen missed the star-studded roster with an eleventh-place time in 22.00. Other notable swimmers featured Swedish veteran Stefan Nystrand (22.32) and France's Amaury Leveaux (22.35), the defending silver medalist, both of whom fell short of the semifinal field by a small fraction of a second on the morning prelims.

Records
Prior to this competition, the existing world and Olympic records were as follows.

Qualification

The Olympic Qualifying Time for the event was 22.11 seconds. Up to two swimmers per National Olympic Committee (NOC) could automatically qualify by swimming that time at an approved qualification event. The Olympic Selection Time was 22.88 seconds. Up to one swimmer per NOC meeting that time was eligible for selection, allocated by world ranking until the maximum quota for all swimming events was reached. NOCs without a male swimmer qualified in any event could also use their universality place.

Competition format

The competition consists of three rounds: heats, semifinals, and a final. The swimmers with the best 16 times in the heats advance to the semifinals. The swimmers with the best 8 times in the semifinals advance to the final. Swim-offs are used as necessary to break ties for advancement to the next round.

Results

Heats

The swimmers with the top 16 times, regardless of heat, advanced to the semifinals.

Semifinals

The swimmers with the top 8 times, regardless of heat, advanced to the final.

Final

References

External links
NBC Olympics Coverage

Men's 00050 metre freestyle
Men's 50 metre freestyle
Men's events at the 2012 Summer Olympics